FC Shakhtar Shakhtarsk is a Ukrainian amateur football club from Shakhtarsk, Ukraine. In 1996 the main squad was transformed to FC Metalurh Donetsk and moved Donetsk. After that the club continued to play at amateur level.

History
Initially FC Shakhtar Shakhtarsk was created in 1984 at the State Production Association "Shakhtarskantratsyt" out of local miners' football teams of Vinnitska Mine and Postnykivska Mine. Until 1989 it competed at regional competitions and then after changing its name to Prometei it entered the Ukrainian amateur competitions where competed until 1991. In 1992 the club was admitted to the Ukrainian Transitional League (third division) from which it was relegated after the first season. In 1992–93 Prometei even though placing sixth gained a promotion to the Second League after FC Antratsyt Kirovske withdrew from competitions. In 1994 the club changed its name to Medita Shakhtarsk after its main sponsor "Medita" (a local private clinic). In 1995 the club changed its name again to Shakhtar after it was returned under the sponsorship of the Shakhtarskantratsyt.

Reorganization

In 1996 based on the senior squad of Shakhtar there was created new club Metalurh Donetsk which became based in Donetsk. The youth squad of Shakhtar Shakhtarsk joined the youth academy of Shakhtar Donetsk, while other players who were not suited for the club formed new team FC Fortuna Shakhtarsk and until 1999 were playing in Kontarne, a suburban urban-type settlement of Shakhtarsk.

Amateur era
In 2000 Fortuna competed at the Ukrainian amateur competitions. Next year the club changed its name again to FC Avanhard Shakhtarsk under which it competed until 2011. From 2012 the team competes under the name Ajax.

Honours
Druha Liha:
7th place: 1994/95
Ukrainian Cup:
1/16 finals: 1994/95

Naming History
1984—1989: Shakhtar Shakhtarsk (ukr. «Шахтар» Шахтарськ)
1990—1993: Prometei Shakhtarsk (ukr. «Прометей» Шахтарськ)
1993—1995: Medita Shakhtarsk (ukr. «Медіта» Шахтарськ)
1995—1996: Shakhtar Shakhtarsk (ukr. «Шахтар» Шахтарськ), in its base was created FC Metalurh Donetsk
1997—2001: Fortuna Kontarne (ukr. «Фортуна» Контарне), in 1999 returned to Shakhtarsk
2001—2009: Avanhard Stizhkivske (ukr. «Авангард» Стiжкiвське), in 2009 returned to Shakhtarsk
2011—2012: FC Shakhtarsk (ukr. ФК «Шахтарськ»)
2012—present: Ayaks Shakhtarsk (ukr. «Аякс» Шахтарськ)

Notes;
 Both Kontarne and Stizhkivske are part of Shakhtarsk city municipality.

League and cup history

{|class="wikitable"
|-bgcolor="#efefef"
! Season
! Div.
! Pos.
! Pl.
! W
! D
! L
! GS
! GA
! P
!Domestic Cup
!colspan=2|Europe
!Notes
|-bgcolor=SkyBlue
|align=center|1991
|align=center|4th
|align=center bgcolor=silver|2
|align=center|30
|align=center|22
|align=center|4
|align=center|4
|align=center|69
|align=center|17
|align=center|48
|align=center|N/A
|align=center|
|align=center|
|align=center|as Prometei Shakhtarsk
|-bgcolor=PowderBlue
|align=center|1992
|align=center|3rd
|align=center|8
|align=center|16
|align=center|8
|align=center|4
|align=center|4
|align=center|27
|align=center|10
|align=center|20
|align=center|N/A
|align=center|
|align=center|
|align=center bgcolor=pink|Relegatedas Prometei Shakhtarsk
|-bgcolor=SkyBlue
|align=center|1992–93
|align=center|3rd "B"
|align=center|6
|align=center|34
|align=center|13
|align=center|16
|align=center|5
|align=center|43
|align=center|21
|align=center|42
|align=center|N/A
|align=center|
|align=center|
|align=center bgcolor=lightgreen|Promotedas Prometei Shakhtarsk
|-bgcolor=PowderBlue
|align=center|1993–94
|align=center rowspan="3"|3rd
|align=center|8
|align=center|42
|align=center|18
|align=center|6
|align=center|18
|align=center|50
|align=center|41
|align=center|42
|align=center|N/A
|align=center|
|align=center|
|align=center|as Medita Shakhtarsk
|-bgcolor=PowderBlue
|align=center|1994–95
|align=center|7
|align=center|42
|align=center|22
|align=center|8
|align=center|12
|align=center|57
|align=center|36
|align=center|74
|align=center|1/16 finals
|align=center|
|align=center|
|align=center|as Medita Shakhtarsk
|-bgcolor=PowderBlue
|align=center|1995–96
|align=center bgcolor=silver|2
|align=center|38
|align=center|24
|align=center|7
|align=center|7
|align=center|53
|align=center|27
|align=center|94
|align=center|Q2 round
|align=center|
|align=center|
|align=center|(in second half as Metalurh Donetsk)
|-bgcolor=SkyBlue
|align=center|2000
|align=center|4th
|align=center|4
|align=center|8
|align=center|2
|align=center|1
|align=center|5
|align=center|13
|align=center|16
|align=center|7
|align=center|N/A
|align=center|
|align=center|
|align=center|Group 8 as Fortuna Shakhtarsk
|}

References

 
Football clubs in Donetsk Oblast
Amateur football clubs in Ukraine
Mining association football teams in Ukraine
Association football clubs established in 1984
1984 establishments in Ukraine